The Noida Sector 137 is the metro station of the Noida Metro railway, in the city of Noida in India. It was opened on 25 January 2019.

The station

It is a very important metro station of the Noida Metro. Nearest residential societies are: Ajnara Daffodil, Logix Blossom County, Exotica Fresco, Paramount Floraville, Paras Tierra, Gulshan Vivante, Purvanchal Royal Park and Supertech Ecocity. Felix hospital is located approximately 200 meter from this metro station. KPMG office is another popular landmark nearest to this metro station. However, the distance between KPMG office and metro station is around 400 meter. McDonald and Subway food points are available at the ground floor of KPMG office building. Medical shops, Shopping basket, hair salons, food points, ATMs of different banks are also available in each residential society market.

References

External links

Noida Metro stations
Railway stations in Gautam Buddh Nagar district
Transport in Noida